The Electric State is an upcoming American science fiction adventure film directed by Anthony and Joe Russo and written by Christopher Markus and Stephen McFeely, based on the graphic novel of the same name by Simon Stålenhag. The film features an ensemble cast that includes Millie Bobby Brown, Chris Pratt, Ke Huy Quan, Stanley Tucci, Jason Alexander, Brian Cox, Jenny Slate, Giancarlo Esposito, Anthony Mackie, and Billy Bob Thornton.

The Electric State is scheduled to be released in 2024, by Netflix.

Premise
A girl is sent a robot by her missing brother, and with it, she sets out to find him.

Cast
 Millie Bobby Brown as Michelle
 Chris Pratt as Keats
 Ke Huy Quan
 Stanley Tucci
 Jason Alexander
 Woody Norman
 Martin Klebba

Voices
 Brian Cox
 Jenny Slate
 Giancarlo Esposito as Marshall
 Anthony Mackie
 Billy Bob Thornton

Production

Development
The film was first announced in December 2017, when Anthony and Joe Russo acquired the rights to the graphic novel. They were set as producers, with Andy Muschietti in negotiations to direct. Christopher Markus and Stephen McFeely were set to write the screenplay. In December 2020, Universal Pictures won the distribution rights to the film, with the Russos now directing and Muschietti remaining as a producer on the project via his new production company. Millie Bobby Brown was slated to star, with production set to begin as soon as the Russos completed The Gray Man (2022) and Brown concluded filming for season four of Stranger Things. In June 2022, it was reported that the film might have its distribution rights transferred to Netflix, as Universal was no longer planning on giving the film a theatrical release. Later that month, it was confirmed that Netflix would be distributing the film, with Chris Pratt in talks to star alongside Brown. Pratt would be confirmed in August, with Michelle Yeoh, Stanley Tucci, Jason Alexander, Brian Cox and Jenny Slate joining the cast. Cox and Slate were reported to be voicing characters in the film. In October, Woody Norman was added to the cast.  In November, Giancarlo Esposito was cast in the film as the voice of Marshall, a menacing robotic drone. Anthony Mackie and Billy Bob Thornton also joined the cast. Ke Huy Quan, Yeoh’s co-star in Everything Everywhere All at Once (2022), had to replace her after she left the project due to scheduling conflicts.

Filming
Principal photography began in October 2022 in Atlanta, under the working title Stormwind. On November 4, 2022, production on the film was temporarily paused after a crew member working on the film was killed in a car crash off-set. Filming officially wrapped in early February 2023.

References

External links
 

Upcoming films
2024 films
2024 science fiction films
2020s American films
2020s English-language films
2020s science fiction adventure films
American robot films
American science fiction adventure films
English-language Netflix original films
Films about missing people
Films about siblings
Films directed by Anthony and Joe Russo
Films scored by Steve Jablonsky
Films shot in Atlanta
Films with screenplays by Christopher Markus and Stephen McFeely
Live-action films based on comics
Upcoming English-language films
Upcoming Netflix original films